Richard Lewis Jenkins (1815 – 13 August 1883) was a Welsh-born Australian politician.

He was born at Newport in Monmouthshire, the son of Richard Jenkins. A qualified medical doctor, he migrated to Sydney for health reasons in 1841. After settling in the Hunter Valley, he married Mary Rae Johnstone, the daughter of the first magistrate. He bought land on the Peel and Namoi rivers. In 1857 he returned to Sydney, and in 1858 he was elected to the New South Wales Legislative Assembly for Liverpool Plains and Gwydir. Re-elected for Gwydir in 1859, he was defeated in 1860. He was an early advocate for compulsory universal public education. Jenkins died at Brisbane in 1883.

References

 

1815 births
1883 deaths
Members of the New South Wales Legislative Assembly
19th-century Australian politicians